The 2018 United States House of Representatives elections in Missouri were held on November 6, 2018, to elect the eight U.S. representatives from the state of Missouri, one from each of the state's eight congressional districts.

Results Summary

Statewide

District
Results of the 2018 United States House of Representatives elections in Missouri by district:

Republican hold

District 1

The 1st district includes all of St. Louis City and much of Northern St. Louis County, and it has a PVI of D+29.  The incumbent is Democrat Lacy Clay, who has represented the district since 2001. He was re-elected with 75% of the vote in 2016. Cori Bush, a Justice Democrat, ran in the Democratic primary.

Democratic primary

Primary results

Republican primary

Primary results

General election

Results

District 2

The 2nd district includes the suburbs south and west of St. Louis City, and the district has a PVI of R+8.  The incumbent is Republican Ann Wagner, who has represented the district since 2013. She was re-elected with 59% of the vote in 2016.

Wagner was considered likely to run for the U.S. Senate in 2018 instead of running for re-election, but opted to seek re-election to the House.

Democratic primary

Primary results

Republican primary
At the filing deadline - one candidate, Noga Sachs, had filed with the Federal Election Commission to run in the Republican primary for a chance to challenge the Republican incumbent, Ann Wagner, August 7, 2018. Despite an attempt by MO GOP to remove Ms. Sachs from the ballot in April 2018, she remains in candidacy.

Primary results

General election

Polling

Results

District 3

The third district stretches from exurbs of St. Louis to the state capital Jefferson City and has a PVI of R+18. The incumbent is Republican Blaine Luetkemeyer, who has represented the district since 2009. He was re-elected with 68% of the vote in 2016.

Democratic primary

Primary results

Republican primary

Primary results

General election

Results

District 4

The fourth district takes in Columbia and much of rural west-central Missouri. It has a PVI of R+17. The incumbent is Republican Vicky Hartzler, who has represented the district since the election of 2010, when she defeated long-time incumbent Democrat Ike Skelton. She was re-elected with 68% of the vote in 2016.

Hartzler has been considered a potential candidate for the U.S. Senate in 2018.

Democratic primary

Primary results

Republican primary

Primary results

General election

Results

District 5

The fifth district encompasses most of Jackson County, the southern part of Clay County, and three other rural counties to the east. It has a PVI of D+7. The incumbent is Democrat Emanuel Cleaver, who has been represented the district since 2005. He was re-elected with 58% of the vote in 2016.

Democratic primary

Primary results

Republican primary

Primary results

General election

Results

District 6

The sixth district encompasses rural northern Missouri, St. Joseph and much of Kansas City north of the Missouri River, and has a PVI of R+16. The incumbent is Republican Sam Graves, who has been represented the district since 2001. He was re-elected with 68% of the vote in 2016.

Democratic primary

Primary results

Republican primary

Primary results

General election

Results

District 7

The seventh district takes in Springfield, Joplin, and much of the rest of rural southwestern Missouri. It has a PVI of R+23. The incumbent is Republican Billy Long, who has been represented the district since 2011. He was re-elected with 68% of the vote in 2016.

Long has been considered a potential candidate for the U.S. Senate in 2018.

Democratic primary

Primary results

Republican primary

Primary results

General election

Results

District 8

The eighth district is the most rural district of Missouri, taking in all of the rural southeastern and south-central part of the state. It has a PVI of R+24, the most strongly Republican district of Missouri. The incumbent is Republican Jason Smith, who has represented the district since 2013 by special election.  He was re-elected with 74% of the vote in 2016.

Democratic primary

Primary results

Republican primary

Primary results

General election

Results

References

External links
Candidates at Vote Smart 
Candidates at Ballotpedia 
Campaign finance at FEC 
Campaign finance at OpenSecrets

Official campaign websites of first district candidates
Lacy Clay (D) for Congress

Official campaign websites of second district candidates
Cort VanOstran (D) for Congress
Ann Wagner (R) for Congress

Official campaign websites of third district candidates
Katy Geppert (D) for Congress
Blaine Luetkemeyer (R) for Congress

Official campaign websites of fourth district candidates
Vicky Hartzler (R) for Congress
Renee Hoagenson (D) for Congress

Official campaign websites of fifth district candidates
Emanuel Cleaver (D) for Congress
Jacob Turk (R) for Congress

Official campaign websites of sixth district candidates
Sam Graves (R) for Congress
Henry Martin (D) for Congress

Official campaign websites of seventh district candidates
Billy Long (R) for Congress
Jamie Schoolcraft (D) for Congress

Official campaign websites of eighth district candidates
Kathy Ellis (D) for Congress
Jason Smith (R) for Congress

Missouri
2018
House